Pandiraj (பாண்டிராஜ் in Tamil) is an Indian film director and producer, writer who works in Tamil cinema. His debut film, Pasanga (2009), was commercially successful and won several awards, including the National Film Award for Best Screenplay.

Early life

Pandiraj was born 7 June 1976 and brought up in Virachilai Township, Pudukkottai, Tamil Nadu, India. After Schooling, he moved to Chennai in 1996. He worked as an "office-boy" with director K. Bhagyaraj. During his early years, he wrote several short stories for the famous Tamil Bagya. Gradually, his interest in film making increased and after hurdles, he got the chance to be an assistant director to filmmaker Cheran. He later worked as an assistant director to Thangar Bachan and Chimbu Deven in six films.

Style
Pandiraj is also famous for making village action family movies. The movies include a lot of family sentiments and focuses on farming.

Career

In 2009, Pandiraj became an independent director with director M. Sasikumar agreeing to produce the film. Titled Pasanga, it was a children's film featuring several new child actors and Vimal in his first lead role. Pasanga was said to be a dedication to Pandiraj's childhood memories and was shot during the school vacations and on weekends. The film was a critical success, winning several national and international awards, including three National Film Awards, and being screened at various film festivals. Following the success of Pasanga, Pandiraj directed his second film, Vamsam with newcomer Arulnithi and Sunaina starring. The film, which was produced by Arulnidhi's father and M. Karunanidhi's youngest son, M. K. Thamizharasu, gained positive reviews and went well in the box office.

In 2012, Pandiraj set up his a film production studio named Pasanga Productions. His first production was his own directorial Marina which marked the feature film debut for television anchor and comedian Sivakarthikeyan. The film received mixed reviews from critics. The director's next Kedi Billa Killadi Ranga was also produced by him. Pandiraj cast the lead actors of his previous films, Sivakarthikeyan and Vimal, in the film, who were paired Bindu Madhavi and Regina Cassandra. The romantic comedy film received positive responses from critics and became a commercial hit. Pandiraj distributed his former assistant Naveen's debut film Moodar Koodam under his Pasanga Productions studio. He also wrote the dialogues for cinematographer Vijay Milton's second directorial Goli Soda. In 2015, Pandiraj has directed another children's film titled Pasanga 2, produced by actor Suriya. He later directed romantic comedy Idhu Namma Aalu (2016) and action thriller,  Kathakali (2016).

In 2018, Kadaikutty Singam was promoted as a film that would inspire the younger generation to take up farming. But Pandiraj loses his aim mid-way and the film becomes one that propagates good familial values and focuses less on farming. Pandiraj win Best Director Tamil in South Indian International Movie Awards. Later, Pandiraj produce Semma and launching his former assistant Vallikanthan as a director with the G. V. Prakash Kumar. With Namma Veettu Pillai (2019), which has actor Sivakarthikeyan in the lead, Pandiraj, once again delivers a film with the importance of families, and the significance of the bond shared between relatives are shown amazingly with ample convincing dialogues and emotional scenes in the film.

Filmography

Director

Distributor
Moodar Koodam (2013)

Awards
 Anandha Vikatan Award for Best Director - Pasanga
 International Children's Film Festival Golden Elephant Award for Best Director - Pasanga
 National Film Award for Best Screenplay (Dialogues) - Pasanga
 Tamil Nadu State Film Award for Best Dialogue Writer - Pasanga
 Vijay Award for Best Find of the Year- Pasanga
 Vijay Award for Best Crew - Pasanga
 World Malayalee Council Award - Pasanga
 Tamil Nadu State Film Award Special Prize - Marina
 Tamil Nadu State Film Award for Best Dialogue Writer - Marina
 South Indian International Movie Awards for Best Director - Kadaikutty Singam

References

External links
 Official website

Tamil film directors
Living people
1976 births
People from Pudukkottai
Tamil screenwriters
Tamil film producers
Indian film distributors
Film directors from Tamil Nadu
Film producers from Tamil Nadu
21st-century Indian film directors
Screenwriters from Tamil Nadu
21st-century Indian dramatists and playwrights
Best Dialogue National Film Award winners
21st-century Indian screenwriters